El Talar may refer to:
 El Talar, Buenos Aires, a town in Tigre Partido, Buenos Aires Province, Argentina
 El Talar, Jujuy, a town in Argentina